Bernhard van Treeck (born 5 February 1964, Kempen, Niederrhein) is a German psychiatrist and has led a clinic specialised in addictions and drug-dependency. As an author he has written several books on graffiti, street-art, drugs and addiction.

Works  
 Piratenkunst (Pirate art 1994)
 Das große Graffiti-Lexikon (The big graffiti lexicon)
 Street-Art Berlin – legale und illegale Kunst im Stadtbild (1999)
 Street-Art Köln – legale und illegale Kunst im Stadtbild (1996)
 Wandzeichnungen (Wall-drawings)
 Writer-Lexikon – American Graffiti (1995)
 Pochoir- die Kunst des Schablonengraffiti (Pochoir -The art of stencil graffiti, 2000, with S. Metze-Prou)
 Graffiti-Art #8 (1998)
 Graffiti Art Deutschland #9 (1998)
 Hall of Fame – Writing in Deutschland (1995, with M. Todt)
 Wholecars – Graffiti auf Zügen (Wholecars – Graffiti on trains, 1996)
 Graffiti-Kalender, edition aragon (editor 1991 – 1997)
 Partydrogen (Party drugs, 1997)
 Der Drogennotfall (The drug case)
 Drogen- und Suchtlexikon (Lexicon of drugs and addictions)
 Das große cannabis-Lexikon (The big cannabis Lexicon, 2000)
 Drogen (Drugs)
 Collaborated on Graffiti-Dortmund and Arbeiten zur Spraybanane 1986 – 1996 (Works on the spray banana).

References

External links
http://www.klvt.de
http://www.schwarzkopf-schwarzkopf.de

1964 births
Living people
German psychiatrists